Lyron Duryea Cobbins (born September 17, 1974) is a former professional American football linebacker. After going to Wyandotte High School, Cobbins attended the University of Notre Dame, and in his senior year was named Third-team All American. Cobbins made his professional debut in the National Football League in 1997 with the Arizona Cardinals. He played for the Arizona Cardinals for his entire one-year career. He is the cousin of Stellar Award winner Chris Cobbins

References

1974 births
Living people
Sportspeople from Kansas City, Kansas
Players of American football from Kansas
American football linebackers
Notre Dame Fighting Irish football players
Arizona Cardinals players